Hayfield Township is a township in Crawford County, Pennsylvania, United States. The population was 2,781 at the 2020 census, down from 2,940 at the 2010 census.

Geography
Hayfield Township is located slightly northwest of the center of Crawford County. It is bordered to the east by French Creek, a south-flowing tributary of the Allegheny River. The borough of Saegertown borders the township to the east across French Creek. Cussewago Creek, a tributary of French Creek, flows southward through the west side of the township.

From Exit 154, I-79 leads north  to Erie and south  to Pittsburgh.
 

Natural Features
Geologic Province: Northwestern Glaciated Plateau
Lowest Elevation:  French Creek where it flows out of township.
Major Rivers/Streams and Watersheds: French Creek (forms eastern border), Cussewago Creek, and Conneaut Outlet
Minor Rivers/Streams and Watersheds:
 Conneaut Outlet tributaries: Watson Run
 Cussewago Creek tributaries: unnamed tributaries
 French Creek tributaries: Wolf Run and its tributary, Brookhouser Creek
Biological Diversity Areas: Cussewago Creek at Onspaugh Corners BDA, Cussewago Creek-Coons Valley BDA, French Creek BDA
Landscape Conservation Areas: French Creek LCA

Demographics

As of the census of 2000, there were 3,092 people, 1,155 households, and 890 families residing in the township.  The population density was 79.6 people per square mile (30.7/km).  There were 1,249 housing units at an average density of 32.1/sq mi (12.4/km).  The racial makeup of the township was 99.06% White, 0.06% African American, 0.19% Native American, 0.23% Asian, 0.06% from other races, and 0.39% from two or more races. Hispanic or Latino of any race were 0.36% of the population.

There were 1,155 households, out of which 34.6% had children under the age of 18 living with them, 64.5% were married couples living together, 8.2% had a female householder with no husband present, and 22.9% were non-families. 19.3% of all households were made up of individuals, and 6.9% had someone living alone who was 65 years of age or older.  The average household size was 2.68 and the average family size was 3.04.

In the township the population was spread out, with 26.6% under the age of 18, 6.8% from 18 to 24, 29.2% from 25 to 44, 25.5% from 45 to 64, and 11.9% who were 65 years of age or older.  The median age was 38 years. For every 100 females, there were 103.2 males.  For every 100 females age 18 and over, there were 100.1 males.

The median income for a household in the township was $39,702, and the median income for a family was $45,871. Males had a median income of $36,473 versus $21,739 for females. The per capita income for the township was $16,973.  About 5.7% of families and 6.6% of the population were below the poverty line, including 9.9% of those under age 18 and 5.0% of those age 65 or over.

References

External links 
 Hayfield Township (Crawford County, PA) Comprehensive Plan

Townships in Crawford County, Pennsylvania
Townships in Pennsylvania